Kim Yong-su (born 1965) is a retired North Korean weightlifter. He won a silver medal at the 1990 World Championships, placing fourth-sixth in 1985, 1986 and 1989. He finished seventh at the 1992 Summer Olympics.

References

1965 births
Living people
North Korean male weightlifters
Weightlifters at the 1992 Summer Olympics
Olympic weightlifters of North Korea
World Weightlifting Championships medalists
20th-century North Korean people